Horns Bridge is a small area on the southeastern edge of Chesterfield, Derbyshire, England which was remarkable at one time for its congested intersection of roads, rivers, footpaths and railways.

Description

Three levels
Horns Bridge was all the more striking because the congestion was three-dimensional:

At ground level:
 the River Hipper
 the River Rother
 the main road to Derby, now the A61
 the main road to Mansfield, now the A617
 the GCR's "Chesterfield Loop", off which ran
 the GCR's "Hyde's Sidings"
 footpaths with associated underbridges and overbridges
At middle level:
 the MR's Main Line, off which ran
 the MR's "Brampton Branch", and
At high level
 the LD&ECR's Main Line to Lincoln

The best place to start to gain an impression of the pre-1960 Horns Bridge is a map. An OS map from the 1940s gives a good idea, with a range of other old Black and White maps fleshing out detail. Maps are two-dimensional, the aerial photograph in "Gt Central North of Nottingham" gives an idea of scale, complexity and height, which "The Changing Face of Chesterfield" and the DVD complement.

Ground level
At ground level, both rivers are prone to flooding, which last happened on a serious scale in 2007 but most recently in November 2019 and once again in February 2020 following storm Dennis. The Horns Bridge area and the inter-war floods are superbly shown in "The Changing Face of Chesterfield."

From Chesterfield town centre the Derby and Mansfield roads separate at Horns Bridge. Nowadays this happens at a large roundabout with several exits. In essence, the A617 Mansfield Road has been upgraded to a dual carriageway running South East to Junction 29 of the M1, incorporating in the process much of the trackbed of the GCR's "Chesterfield Loop." South of Horns Bridge the A61 Derby Road is less changed, it is still a traditional two lane road. North of Horns Bridge, however, it has been dualled and re-routed to follow the alignment of the GCR Chesterfield Loop through the town, although bypassing the former GCR tunnel. The southern entrance to this tunnel can still be seen through the fence at the junction of Hollis Lane and Dixon's Road.

Travelling southwards from Sheffield Victoria, the GCR's double-track Chesterfield Loop branched West off the GCR's Main Line at Staveley and rejoined it at Heath. Its station in Chesterfield was Chesterfield Central, situated North of the Town Centre. The station closed on 5 March 1963. Tracks South of the station to Grassmoor and Heath were lifted in the Winter of 1963/4.

South from Chesterfield Central the line went immediately into Chesterfield Tunnel, from which it emerged a few hundred yards North of Horns Bridge. It then ran under the Brampton Branch, under a footbridge, under the Midland line, under another footbridge, under the LD&ECR line, over its junction with Hyde's Sidings and finally into open country. This plethora of activity was crammed into a few hundred yards at Horns Bridge.

The first footpath referred to above ran West to East from the main road. It immediately crossed the Loop Line to the West of the Midland Line using a footbridge known locally as "40 Steps." It then went under the Midland Line. The other footpath ran South to North to the East of the Midland line and crossed the Loop line between the Midland Line and Hyde's sidings. Both footbridges were wonderful places for trainspotting, photography and superb sketches and paintings by Chesterfield artist David Charlesworth.

Hyde's Sidings were laid by the GCR off the Loop and served factories to the East of the Midland line at the bottom of Hady Hill. The exit from the sidings onto the loop was protected by a gate, which was a source of mystery to lay observers.

Middle level
At the middle level was the first railway into Chesterfield, the MR's main line from Sheffield Midland to London St Pancras, now widely known as the Midland Main Line. Chesterfield Midland was (and still is) North of the town centre, to the East of Chesterfield Central. Its four tracks crossed the Mansfield Road (Hasland Road) over Horns Bridge immediately East of the junction with Derby Road. The same general layout exists today, though the road junction is now a large roundabout, as described above.  The western pair of tracks were used by all passenger trains and some goods trains. The eastern pair were only used by goods trains. Nowadays some passenger services also use the eastern tracks, so healthy is the level of passenger traffic on the line, which has been chosen for electrification in the next few years.

The MR's Brampton Branch turned West off the main line between the Midland station and Horns Bridge. It was single track and never a passenger railway. It was normally worked by an LMS "Jinty" tank. A curious survivor is a pair of "bridges to nowhere" built to serve the Brampton Branch when the major reconstruction of the roads and buildings in the Horns Bridge area took place in the 1980s. When the factories of Bryan Donkin and Chesterfield Cylinders were moved out of town and the land redeveloped to housing and retail in the early 21st century, the remaining tracks were lifted and the branch now forms the main part of the Hipper Valley Trail of the Chesterfield cycle network between Chesterfield railway station and Walton Dam. As part of this work the original bridge across Lordsmill Street between the two modern "bridges to nowhere" was replaced.

High level
At high level was the most dramatic feature at Horns Bridge - the LD&ECR's main line which strode across all the features described above on a major viaduct. This structure consisted of seven brick arches and four girder spans, 63 feet high, flanked by substantial embankments in both directions. The line ran from Chesterfield Market Place to Lincoln Central. Horns Bridge was reputed to be one of only two places in the world where three railways crossed at one spot at three levels, the other being in the USA. Strictly, the lines didn't cross at exactly one spot, but that would be to split hairs. Passenger services from Market Place station ended on 3 December 1951, with total closure coming in March 1957. Tracks were lifted but the embankment and viaduct at Horns Bridge remained intact until 1960, when the metal girder spans were removed. The brick uprights and arches remained in place like Megaliths until 1985 when they and the embankment to the West were swept away for the road alterations mentioned above.

Today

The Horns Bridge that replaced the original (1840) brick arch in 1932 still carries the mainline over Hasland Road. The road is, however, closed to traffic, that having diverted onto the Hasland Bypass (A617) before reaching the roundabout.  Today the only indication that the LD&ECR's massive engineering, land occupancy and buildings ever existed West of Horns Bridge is some blue brickwork beside this bridge, shown on an attached photograph. To the East of Horns Bridge the remnants of an embankment and cutting at Spital give some idea of the scale and cost of that undertaking. The GCR's Chesterfield Loop leaves no trace either, though the year stone from the construction of the tunnel has been restored by kindred spirits at the Chesterfield Canal.

Following the trend to adorn busy roundabouts the Horns Bridge traffic island now proudly displays a sculpture entitled 'Growth' by local designer, Melanie Jackson. All within sight of Chesterfield's iconic Crooked Spire.

'The design celebrates Chesterfield's strong industrial heritage, whilst also looking forward, towards the town's future growth and development. A large Weathering Steel, 'wheel' or 'cog' appears to grow out of the landscape, symbolising industry, the spokes twist upwards at the centre to form an opening flower - representing the town's growth and future, which is yet to unfold. The sculpture stands approximately 8 m tall and is 8 m wide.
The design of the 'flower' is influenced by the flower of the Pomegranate Tree, which features on the towns coat of arms. The eight petals relate to the eight twisting facets of the town's 
famous spire and also represent eight community areas that make up Chesterfield, eight sculptural dry stone walls will radiate out from the artwork, blending the sculpture with the landscape.
The inside of the opening 'flower petals' have a contrasting satin polished, stainless steel finish, bringing brightness and 'life' to the inside of the opening artwork. In the centre, a cluster of 'growing' anther (pollen) reach upwards, these are also stainless steel. Lighting beneath and within the structure gives a different, night time effect of the sculpture. The sculpture was manufactured by Chris Brammall Ltd.'
https://www.melaniejacksondesigns.com/growth-chesterfield

References

Bibliography

Further reading

External links

Midland Railway
Great Central Railway
Chesterfield, Derbyshire
Rail transport in Derbyshire
Lancashire, Derbyshire and East Coast Railway structures